Zgornji Dražen Vrh (known as Dražen Vrh until 2002) is a dispersed settlement in the Slovene Hills in northeastern Slovenia. The northern part of the settlement belongs to the Municipality of Šentilj. The rest of the settlement belongs to the Municipality of Sveta Ana

References

External links
Zgornji Dražen Vrh on Geopedia

Populated places in the Municipality of Šentilj